Touch and Go, also known as Point of No Return, (Chinese: 一觸即發) is a 1991  Hong Kong action thriller film directed by Ringo Lam and starring Sammo Hung.

Plot
Police officer Pitt's (Wan Yeung-ming) partner Lau was killed by the triads. The case also involves the seizure of a number of pornographic photos of politicians from an earlier investigation. The murder was witnessed by chef Fat Goose (Sammo Hung), and Pitt forces him to be the eyewitness and have the killer arrested. The killer, Lam Man-fu (Tommy Wong), however, was bailed out by his lawyer Kam Tse-ping (Lam Chung) and Pitt's superior Keung (Lau Kong) also forbids him from interfering with this case. At this time, Fat Goose's house was also torched and was determined to cooperate with Pitt to tackle the triads.

Cast
Sammo Hung as Fat Goose
Irene Wan as May
Wan Yeung-ming as Pitt
Teresa Mo as Angel
Tommy Wong as Lam Man-fu / God of Hell
Ann Mui as Lulu
Lam Chung as Kam Tse-ping
Billy Chow as Ping's kicking thug
Lau Kong as Keung Sir
Terrence Fok as Fireball
Victor Hon as Bau Shing-tze
Law Lan as Goose's mother
Cheng Siu-ping as Friend of Goose's mother
Frankie Ng as Hell's thug with knife
Ho Yik-ming
Chan Chi-fai as Hell's thug with knife
Yan Chung-wai
Lee Wah-kon
Simon Cheung as Policeman
Lee Kwong-tim

Box office
The film grossed HK$4,323,530 at the Hong Kong box office during its theatrical run from 16 to 22 May 1991 in Hong Kong.

See also
Sammo Hung filmography

External links

Touch and Go at Hong Kong Cinemagic

1991 films
1991 action thriller films
1991 martial arts films
Hong Kong action thriller films
Hong Kong action comedy films
Hong Kong martial arts films
Martial arts comedy films
Police detective films
Triad films
Films directed by Ringo Lam
1990s Cantonese-language films
Golden Harvest films
Films set in Hong Kong
Films shot in Hong Kong
1990s Hong Kong films